Myrton O. Wegener (November 7, 1917 – May 5, 1991) was an American businessman and politician.

Wegener was born in Woodside Township, Otter Tail County, Minnesota. He went to the Bertha, Todd County, Minnesota public schools and graduated from Bertha High School. Wegener served as mayor of Bertha, Minnesota. He was a farmer. Wegener was also involved with the creamery, real estate, farm equipment dealership, and used car dealership businesses. Wegerner served in the Minnesota Senate from 1971 to 1982 and was a Democrat. Wegener served on the Todd County Commission in 1991 and died while still in office. Wegener died from a heart attack at his home in Bertha, Minnesota.

Notes

1917 births
1991 deaths
People from Todd County, Minnesota
People from Otter Tail County, Minnesota
Businesspeople from Minnesota
Farmers from Minnesota
Mayors of places in Minnesota
County commissioners in Minnesota
Democratic Party Minnesota state senators